In Cork, the largest radio stations throughout most of the 1980s were ERI (1982–1988), founded by Joe O'Connor, and the original South Coast Radio (1982–1984), founded by Pete O'Neill and Peter Maher. ERI unsuccessfully applied for a commercial license in the area in 1989 under the name 'Sound of the South.' Subsequently, its studio and transmission facilities were leased to a new licensed station, titled 'Radio South,' in 1989, allowing this new station to be operational relatively quickly. Radio South was relaunched in July 1990 as 96FM and eventually bought out by County Sound in February 1991, with the original four shareholders selling all their shares to the Mallow-based station.

WKLR & NCCR
Outside of Cork city in County Cork, the two most significant stations during the 1980s were the Bandon-based WKLR, and NCCR (North Cork Community Radio), which broadcast from the old Majestic Ballroom in Mallow. WKLR (West Cork Local Radio) founded in 1984, initially intended for the West Cork area, but towards the end of the station's life had extended its transmission to cover Cork city and much of the rest of Co. Cork. The close-down night of NCCR in Mallow on December 31, 1988, was struck by tragedy, when local farmer and former presenter and shareholder of the station - Pat O'Connor - who was participating in an interview - collapsed and died suddenly during a commercial break. The station immediately announced it was closing earlier than planned "due to unforeseen circumstances". Pat O'Connor had also been a brief national celebrity when he was chosen as a representative of rural Ireland to guest present an edition of the 'Saturday Live' chat show on RTÉ TV in 1987, however his RTÉ appearance meant he had to resign his involvement in the pirate NCCR to avoid controversy beforehand, and did not appear on NCCR again until the closedown night. NCCR had come into being in 1985 when a community co-operative took over the ownership of a previous station – NCLR (North Cork Local Radio) that had been in existence since 1981.

Radio Caroline
This long-running Cork station formed in 1981 and launched on Cork's airwaves on May 22, same air started its life broadcasting from a ground-floor apartment in Togher on Cork's southside on 98.8 FM, moving on later in 1982 to an upstairs studios in Cornmarket Street for a few weeks before returning later  to a  mobile home studios based back in Togher and adding a mW transmitter to its transmission side on 253 AM, later changing the frequency to 1557 kHz or 194 mW. A lot of well-known names in broadcasting today passed through its studio doors down over the years, moving on later in life to carve out careers on local and national radio and TV. Dave Hammond, the founder, is still involved in its running up to this present day.

Community Radio Youghal
Another pirate station in County Cork was Community Radio Youghal (CRY), whose existence, (like NCLR in Mallow) was ironically inspired by a stint in the town of RTÉ's mobile community radio station (which provided temporary community radio services during visits to dozens of towns nationwide in the 1980s). CRY had been on air for almost a decade and was one of the longest surviving pirates in Ireland when it closed at the end of 1988. CRY returned to the airwaves 7 years later in 1995 with a license, and currently broadcasts on 104.0 MHz to Youghal town and surrounding areas from a 25 Watt transmitter located on the town's water tower at Cork Hill.

Radio Friendly
The 1990s also saw the birth of one of Cork's most memorable pirate stations, Radio Friendly. Radio Friendly provided Corkonians with music from the "Underground" DJs of Cork, some from the infamous Sir Henry's nightclub at the time and its DJs included Stevie G and Greg & Shane of Fish Go Deep. The station got its name from its owners MR P, Miss Ken D and some DJs from Dublin's Power FM. The original transmitter was the original Power 98.7FM equipment. Radio Friendly for most of its existence was on 104.6FM but moved to 104.0FM in late 2001 until its closure in 2003 - Radio Friendly won the Best Irish Dance station award beating all the national stations at the Smirnoff Irish Dance awards.

Kiss 105.5 FM
Another big station in the late 1990s and early 2000s was Kiss 105.5FM which had a more commercial side than Radio Friendly and was aimed at a younger audience. Such DJs such as Colin Edwards, Damien Sreenan, Dave Newman and Derek O Keefe were regulars on this; it closed down in 2001. Kiss actually first appeared on 105.3FM, but moved to 105.5 some months later after they extended coverage. They later introduced another transmitter for the north Cork area on 107.1 lasting until it broke down.

Kiss 106.5/94.8/87.8/88.7/104.9 
Kiss (previously called NRG 2003-04) started on 106.5 in April 2004 by Pete O'Neill who also owned NRG and fronted by Colin Edwards and were on air for over 6 months, then were raided, Kiss had their name built and was very popular to the younger audience of Cork. One of the reasons this happened was the large Max Power Event that was advertised on the station. There were hundreds of cars and thousands of people in attendance. There was a car crash on the road near Douglas. This was attributed to the station and therefore was closed down. The Evening Echo carried the story in 2 pages and this worried some stations. The other station's presenters then complained from the point of view of ratings. Hence why they switched frequencies due to the fact they were to be close to that other station's frequency.
This was the main pirate station in Cork and was more known on Kiss 94.8, but they were the subject of much Comreg attention and had been raided three times having broadcasting equipment confiscated. The station also featured many local big DJs. In 2007 the owner of Kiss launched a second station Play 87.7FM which broadcast house, techno & trance music and remained on air for a year. A 2008 relaunch of Kiss 94.8 lasted only 3 weeks with the station being raided once again (13/08/2008 13:00) and all equipment was confiscated while off air. Kiss FM was also subject to a raid while DJ’s were performing a switch-over of shows. This was at an outdoor broadcast from Funderland where Kiss were subject to three-studios (two on-site and one outdoor). 

Kiss made another return to 88.7 for 2 months and closed due to the fact of another station that they were going joining with.[NRG887] They then separated and the old kiss members surprisingly made a return once again (24/06/2012) to the airwaves on 104.9Mhz for a period of time before suddenly disappearing from the airwaves on 01/11/2013 and has not reappeared.

NRG 88.7 FM

NRG 88.7MHZ
Tied from the old NRG 106.5 and Kiss 106.5/94.8 and linked with the owners of the old Pulse 106.5 & Galaxy FM (Francis Hennessy) to create NRG 88.7MHZ.
Later the Kiss owner (Pete O Neil) separated and once again brought Kiss FM back to the airwaves on 104.9FM, while NRG was still being run on 88.7Mhz by the old Pulse & Galaxy Fm owner but was on and off the air due to equipment issues.

Radio NOW 87.8FM

Radio NOW was Cork's Underground Soundtrack playing Non Stop HD&T (House, Dance & Trance) broadcasting on 87.8 FM in Cork and surrounding suburbs. The station owner was Cork DJ Steve O’C. Following the success of running club nights in the Roxy nightclub (audio rooms) cork for the final year of broadcasting. The Roxy club closed and Radio NOW also went off air in May 2013 after 2 years on air. Hosting up to 25 DJs on the station with a variety of all styles of house, dance, trance, techno, drum&bass, R'n'B, hip hop and dubstep.

FreakFM 105.2
FreakFM began in Mallow, North Cork in 2000 before moving to Cork city in early 2001.  Music was a mix of Indie Rock, alternative and metal.  The station closed down after a few months.  In 2004 the station began broadcasting again from a city center studio and programming was much more diverse than the original Freakfm format. Rock, Metal, Indie, Soul, Funk, Reggae, eclectic were some of the genres of shows   The station continued until December 2005 when Comreg raided two of the transmitter sites, the main studio was not raided and the station continued for 1 more week until permanent shutdown 31 December 2005.

Pastime Urban Pirates
Radio Caroline Cork (1981–2017)
 88.7/87.5 FusionRadio (2013-2015)
 94.8 Powerfm [1990s]
 97.8 Lighthouse [1990s]
 100.6 Heat FM        [2004]
 101.5 Buzz FM        [2003–2005]
 101.5 Fresh FM       [2005]
 101.5 Static FM      [2006]
 101.5 Rush FM        [2006]
 106.5 LUV FM         (1999–2001)
 106.5 MIX FM         (2001–2003)
 102.3 Vintage FM     [2002]
 104.0 klub FM        [1999–2001]
 104.4 klub FM         [2001–2005]
 104.0 x-FM (formerly klub) [2005–2006]
 104.0 klub FM        [2006–2009]
 104.6 Radio Friendly [1996–2001]
 104.0 Radio Friendly [2001–2002]
 106.8 K.2.           [1996–1999]
 105.5 Kiss FM        [1999-2001]
 107.1 Kiss FM        [2000?]  North Cork transmitter of the above Kiss FM
 106.7 Liquid Radio   [May 2011]
 105.0 Galaxy         [1 Month 2006]
 106.5 Nrg FM         [2003] became Kiss FM (April 2004)
 106.5 Kiss FM        [2004–2006]
 94.8  Kiss FM        [2006–2008]
 87.7  Play FM        (2007) Affiliated to Kiss FM
 87.8  Kiss FM        [2009]
 88.7  Kiss FM        (2009–2011)
 104.9 Kiss FM        (2012 – 1 Nov 2013)
 95.5  Pulse FM       [2005–2007]
 106.5 Pulse FM       [2007–2008]
 105.2 Freak FM       [2004]
 106.5 Spin FM        [2006]
 106.5 Heat FM        [2006]
 107.4 BPM            [2004]
 107.4 Fresh FM       [2005]
 107.4 Galaxy         [2004 - 2005]
 107.4 Tech FM        [2006]
 107.5 Spin FM        [2006]
 107.5 Phantom        [2007]
 87.7  Sub FM         [2005 - 2006]
 87.7  Heat FM        [2006]
 93.1  Heat FM        [2004 - 2005]
 94.8  Tech FM        [2003]
 105.2 Dream FM       [2006 - 2007] Station in Clonakilty
 93.3  Touch FM       [2007]
 104.0 Rush FM        [2007]
 104.0 Klub FM        [2000– ?]
 104.2 Klub FM        [2000–2007]
 94.8  Club FM        [1999–2000]
 105.2 Vibe FM        [2007]
 101.5 Storm FM       [2007]
 97.4  Galaxy-FM      [2008 - 2009]
 100.5 Galaxy-FM      [2009]
 87.8  Galaxy-FM      [2009]
 88.7  Galaxy-FM      (2011–2012)
 88.7  Ice-FM         (2011)
 100.5 Buzz-FM        (2011)
 88.9  Kiss-FM        (2011)
 87.8  Radio NOW      (2011–2013)
 104.9 Kiss-FM        (2012-2014)
 104.9 JAMM FM        (2012)
 88.7/87.5 FusionRadio       (2013-2015)
 104.9 DHR            (2015-2017)
 87.8  Klub FM        (2013–2015)
 87.5  Klub FM        (2015–2018)
 87.8  Play 87.8      (2018–2019)
 87.8/87.5 Klub FM      (2012 - 2018)
87.8  TRUE Radio     (2017–2020)
87.5 Power 87 (2018-2021)

Current Pirates on air (as of August 2022)

 107.0 Caroline 
 97.6 Cityview
 87.5 KiisFM
 104.9 Global 
As of August 2022, there are four pirates who transmit on FM.

See also
 Irish pirate radio

References

External links
 Radiowaves.FM's database of Cork's Radio Stations

Radio stations in the Republic of Ireland
Mass media in County Cork
Cork